Jubilee Window is a 1935 British comedy film directed by George Pearson and starring Sebastian Shaw, Ralph Truman and Olive Melville.

Cast
 Sebastian Shaw as Peter Ward  
 Ralph Truman as Dan Stevens  
 Olive Melville as Margery Holroyd  
 Frank Birch as Ambrose Holroyd  
 Margaret Yarde as Mrs. Holroyd 
 Michael Shepley as Dacres  
 Winifred Oughton as Mrs. Tribbets  
 Robert Horton as Sir Edward Musgrove  
 Dorothy Hammond as Lady Musgrove  
 Mark Daly as Dave 
 Walter Amner 
 Frank Bertram
 Doris Hare

References

Bibliography
 Low, Rachael. Filmmaking in 1930s Britain. George Allen & Unwin, 1985.
 Wood, Linda. British Films, 1927-1939. British Film Institute, 1986.

External links

1935 films
1930s English-language films
1935 comedy films
British comedy films
Films set in England
Paramount Pictures films
British black-and-white films
British and Dominions Studios films
Films shot at Imperial Studios, Elstree
1930s British films